Trevor Baptiste (born July 3, 1996) is an American professional lacrosse player who is a face-off specialist for the Atlas Lacrosse Club of the Premier Lacrosse League and currently for the Philadelphia Wings of the National Lacrosse League. He attended the University of Denver, where he set the NCAA Division I season record for face-off wins by a freshman. During the 2015 regular season, Baptiste led all of college lacrosse in face-off win percentage (72%). He also set the Pioneers' school record for face-off wins during a season. He was selected first overall in the 2018 MLL Draft, by the Boston Cannons. Baptiste has won the PLL Faceoff Athlete of the Year Award three times (2019, 2021, 2022).

Early life and education

Trevor Baptiste, son of Dena Y. Baptiste and Leon K. Baptiste, was born in Newark, New Jersey. He grew up in Roxbury Township, New Jersey with his sister Breeann Baptiste and then moved to Denville Township, New Jersey. Baptiste graduated from Morristown-Beard School in Morristown, New Jersey in 2014. During his high school years, he played on the lacrosse and swimming teams for four seasons. Baptiste was an Under Armour Underclass All American in 2013.

During his senior year, Baptiste served as a captain of the lacrosse team. He helped guide Morristown-Beard to an undefeated season (8-0) as the 17th ranked team in New Jersey. Baptiste also helped drive a playoff run that earned the team runner-up for the state championship. Morristown-Beard School awarded him their Most Valuable Player Award and Alden C. Hess Award for his work ethic. Baptiste also earned selection to the 2014 US Lacrosse All American Team and The Star-Ledger'''s First Team All State. He went 80% in face-offs that season, scored 42 goals, and notched 22 assists. During his high school career, Baptiste scored 100 goals and notched 43 assists. He also scooped up a net total of 640 ground balls.

College lacrosse career

Recruited for Denver in 2014
During his college search in 2014, Baptiste initially considered attending an NCAA Division III school. He had planned to play for the Franklin & Marshall Diplomats in Lancaster, Pennsylvania until the University of Denver called. In March, Baptiste took a late season recruiting visit to Denver, Colorado, and he signed an intent to play for the Pioneers in April. (By coincidence, Denver shares a school color of crimson with his high school alma mater, which competes as the Crimson.)

Tapping his prowess in face-offs, Denver named Baptiste their new face-off specialist. He took over the role from junior Chris Hampton, who switched over to winger on face-offs. In October, Baptiste dominated face-offs in the Pioneers' exhibition game against the defending champion Denver Outlaws. He won 76.9% of his face-offs to drive Denver's 15–7 victory over the Major League Lacrosse team.

2015 season
Making his season debut, Baptiste dominated face-offs in Denver's season opening victory over the defending champion Duke Blue Devils. He won 73.5% of his face-off attempts. Baptiste's 25 face-off wins came close to tying the Pioneers' record for face-off wins in a game (26). The Big East Conference and NCAA.com both named Baptiste their offensive player of the week.

During the 2015 season, Baptiste ranked sixth in ground balls per game in the Big East Conference. He led the conference and the nation in face-off win percentage. Baptiste scored 7 goals and notched 5 assists. During a game against the Providence Friars, Baptiste won 91.7% of his face-offs to guide the Pioneers' comeback victory. In May, he went 73.1% in face-offs in Denver's 16–8 defeat of the Georgetown Hoyas to capture the Big East tournament championship.

Baptiste's overall performances during his rookie season earned him the nickname "The Beast". The Big East Conference awarded him their 2015 Midfielder of the Year Award and named him to First Team All-Big East. Baptiste was the only freshman named among the 25 nominees for the Tewaaraton Trophy for the top lacrosse player announced on April 23, 2015. In May, the United States Intercollegiate Lacrosse Association (USILA) named him a First Team All-American. Baptiste was one of seven Pioneers selected for the All-American Team, the most in school history. Connor Cannizzaro and he were only the second and third Pioneers to achieve DI First Team All-America honors in school history. Baptiste was also the first freshman selected as a First Team All American since 2001.

In his first playoff-game, Baptiste went only 42% in face-offs in a victory over the Brown Bears. Reaching the quarterfinals, he re-bounded against the Ohio State Buckeyes. Baptiste won 13 of his final 23 face-offs (56.5%) to help drive a comeback win by Denver to reach the NCAA Tournament Final Four. In the semi-finals, he exerted greater dominance in face-offs against the Notre Dame Fighting Irish. Baptiste won 15 of his 24 face-offs (62.5%) to power Denver's overtime victory to reach the championship final. He reached the milestone of 300 face-off wins in the victory. Baptiste's 24 face-off attempts also advanced him higher among all-time DI players making 400 or more face-off attempts in a season. His 437 face-off attempts in 2015 trailed only past performances by Duke's Brendan Fowler, Albany's Kevin Klueckert, and Bryant's Kevin Massa.

In the NCAA DI Tournament Final, Baptiste won 10 out of 19 face-offs (52.6%) against the Maryland Terrapins. His performance helped drive the Pioneers to the championship victory, the first in school history and the first west of the Appalachian Mountains. The NCAA named Baptiste and teammates Ryan LaPlante, Zach Miller, Mike Riis, and Wesley Berg to the All-Tournament Team. Berg won the Tournament's Most Valuable Player Award.

Baptiste finished the 2015 season with 310 face-off wins out of 456 attempts and 140 ground balls. This marked the fourth best season in face-off wins in DI college lacrosse history. Only Fowler, Massa, and Alex Smith of Delaware have won more face-offs in a season. Only Fowler and Klueckert have had more face-off attempts in a season. Following the season, Sports Illustrated featured Baptiste for their article on the art of face-offs. In June, Lacrosse Magazine'' selected Baptiste as one of their 13 Year-End All-Americans. Inside Lacrosse named him their 2015 Freshman of the Year.

2016 season 
Baptiste would win double digit faceoffs in every game as a sophomore, finishing the season having won 69.4% of his faceoffs, and he would set a school record with 20 ground balls in a single game in a 17-10 win over St. John's. Baptiste would once again be named a First Team All American and Big East midfielder of the year.

2017 season 
As a junior, Baptiste led the nation in faceoff percentage (74.4%), and was second in total faceoff wins (297) while also scoring twelve goals. Notably, he scored his first career hat trick as well as adding an assist and winning 23 of 28 faceoffs in a 16-11 win over Villanova.

2018 season 
As a senior, Baptiste would set the NCAA career record for faceoff wins in the Big East Tournament against Marquette, though this record would eventually be broken by TD Ierlan. He would be named a first team All American for the fourth time, becoming just the sixth player ever to do so.

International career 
Baptiste was selected for Team USA for the 2018 World Lacrosse Championship, where he won 67 of 89 faceoffs as the USA would capture the gold medal. He would also represent the United States at the 2019 World Indoor Lacrosse Championship, winning a bronze medal.

Professional career

Major League Lacrosse
Baptiste was drafted first overall by the Boston Cannons of the MLL in 2018, where he recorded 3 goals and a face-off percentage of 55.4%.

National Lacrosse League
For box lacrosse, Baptiste plays for the Philadelphia Wings, where he had 7 assists and a face-off percentage of 68%.

Premier Lacrosse League
In 2019, Baptiste decided to join Paul Rabil's new PLL. Rabil said on Pardon My Take that he made sure that Baptiste ended up on the Atlas Lacrosse Club roster because he wanted the best FOGO in the league. Finishing in the top two in the fan vote, Baptiste was selected as a captain for the 2019 PLL All-Star Game. He led the league in faceoff percentage and grounds balls at the end of the 2019 season.

In the 2022 season, Baptiste won the Jim Brown MVP Award, as well as his third Paul Cantabene Faceoff Athlete of the Year Award having won 70 percent of his faceoffs, along with scoring 10 points.

Statistics

MLL

NLL

PLL

References

1996 births
Living people
American lacrosse players
Sportspeople from Morris County, New Jersey
Sportspeople from Newark, New Jersey
People from Denville, New Jersey
People from Roxbury, New Jersey
Lacrosse players from New Jersey
Morristown-Beard School alumni
Denver Pioneers men's lacrosse players
Premier Lacrosse League players
Lacrosse transitions